Phillip Dennis Ivey Jr. (born February 1, 1977) is an American professional poker player who has won ten World Series of Poker bracelets, one World Poker Tour title, and appeared at nine World Poker Tour final tables. Ivey is regarded by numerous poker observers and contemporaries as the best all-around player in the world.  In 2017, he was elected to the Poker Hall of Fame.

Background 
Ivey first began to develop his poker skills by playing against co-workers at a New Brunswick, New Jersey, telemarketing firm in the late 1990s.  One of his nicknames, "No Home Jerome", stems from the fake ID card he secured to play poker in Atlantic City, New Jersey, in his teenage years. He was given the nickname "The Phenom" after winning three World Series of Poker bracelets in 2002.  His other nickname is "the Tiger Woods of Poker".

Poker

Live poker

World Series of Poker
Ivey's tournament accomplishments include winning three bracelets at the 2002 World Series of Poker, tying Phil Hellmuth Jr, Ted Forrest, and Puggy Pearson for most World Series tournament wins in a single year (Jeff Lisandro and George Danzer have since tied the record). He also has bracelets in Pot Limit Omaha from 2000 and 2005. In 2000, Ivey was the first person to defeat Amarillo Slim heads-up at a WSOP final table. His victory over Amarillo Slim was for his first career bracelet. In addition to his ten World Series bracelets, Ivey has had great success in the WSOP Main Event. He placed in the top 25 four times between the 2002 World Series of Poker and the 2009 World Series of Poker. Ivey finished 23rd in 2002, 10th in 2003, 20th in 2005, and 7th in 2009.

In 2009, Ivey won his sixth career bracelet in the $2,500 No-Limit 2-7 Draw Lowball Event of the 2009 WSOP. He defeated a field of 147 players to catch his bracelet. He won a very long heads-up battle against John Monnette. He then proceeded to win another bracelet in the $2,500 1/2 Seven Card Stud Hi/Lo 1/2 Omaha Hi/Lo event besting a field of 376 people. He defeated Ming Lee heads-up. In addition to winning the $2,500 1/2 Seven Card Stud Hi/Lo - 1/2 Omaha Hi/Lo event, he managed to place 22nd in the $5,000 Pot-Limit Omaha Eight-or-better despite only playing during the breaks in the Stud/Omaha event.

In the 2010 World Series of Poker, Ivey received the most votes for the Tournament of Champions.

At the 2010 WSOP, Ivey won his eighth bracelet in the $3,000 H.O.R.S.E. event in a final table made up of other notable players, which included Bill Chen (2nd), John Juanda (3rd), Jeff Lisandro (5th), and  Chad Brown (8th).

Between 2002 and 2009, Ivey finished among the top 25 players in the Main Event four times, in fields ranging in size from 600 entrants to just under 7,000. Ivey finished 10th in the 2003 WSOP Main Event (one place short of the final table), and  7th in 2009. In 2009, his  lost to Darvin Moon's  when a queen paired Moon on the flop; he ended his 2009 Main Event with winnings of $1,404,002.

With 10 World Series of Poker bracelets, Ivey is currently tied with Doyle Brunson and Johnny Chan for the second most all-time.  Also, at age 38, he is the youngest player to ever win ten bracelets. He broke Phil Hellmuth's mark of 42 years old at the time of his tenth bracelet. In addition, no other player has accumulated ten bracelets more quickly; it took Ivey only 14 years from the time of his first bracelet to his tenth (Phil Hellmuth took 17 years).  He is also the all-time record holder for most bracelets won in non-Holdem events, with all 10 of his victories coming in non-Holdem events.  His 2010 win gave him the lead over Billy Baxter.  He is also the WSOP record holder for most mixed-game bracelets having won five in his career.  He won one in S.H.O.E. in 2002, Omaha Hi/Lo / 7 Card Stud Hi/Lo in 2009, H.O.R.S.E. in 2010, WSOP APAC Mixed Event in 2013, and Eight Game Mix in 2014.

Notable World Series of Poker statistics

Thomas "Amarillo Slim" Preston's last final table appearance at the World Series of Poker was his heads-up match against Phil Ivey where Ivey won his first bracelet.

An "A" following a year denotes bracelet(s) won at the World Series of Poker Asia-Pacific

World Poker Tour
Ivey has also reached nine final tables on the World Poker Tour. He has lost several of these WPT events by being eliminated while holding the same starting hand each time, an ace and a queen. Nine out of the twelve times Ivey has cashed in a WPT event, he has also made the television final table. During the sixth season of the WPT in February 2008, Ivey made the final table at the LA Poker Classic at Commerce Casino that included 15-time bracelet winner Phil Hellmuth and Nam Le, eventually capturing the $1,596,100 first prize and putting an end to his streak of seven WPT final tables without a victory. Ivey has earned close to three million dollars in WPT cashes. Ivey made his debut on the European Poker Tour in Barcelona, September 2006. He came to the final table of nine as the chip leader, but he eventually finished runner-up to Bjørn-Erik Glenne from Norway.

Other notable tournaments
In 2006, Ivey played in The London All Star Challenge of the inaugural European Poker Masters. Ivey made it to the final table to finish seventh, and collected £6,700 ($12,534). In November 2005, Ivey won the $1,000,000 first prize at the Monte Carlo Millions tournament. The following day, Ivey took home another $600,000 for finishing first at "The FullTiltPoker.Net Invitational Live from Monte Carlo".  His six opponents were (in reverse finishing order) Mike Matusow, Phil Hellmuth, Gus Hansen, Chris Ferguson, Dave Ulliott, and John Juanda.

On the January 22, 2007, airing of NBC's Poker After Dark, Ivey won the $120,000 winner-take-all "Earphones Please" tournament by eliminating Matusow, Tony G, Andy Bloch, Hellmuth, and Sam Farha. On the April 15, 2007, airing of NBC's "National Heads-Up Poker Championship", Ivey was defeated by actor Don Cheadle in the first round. That was the third consecutive year where Ivey was eliminated in the first round of this tournament. His streak ended in 2008, when he advanced to the semifinals, losing to eventual champion Ferguson. Ivey took part in seasons three and six of GSN's High Stakes Poker.

On January 29, 2012, Ivey won the Aussie Millions A$250,000 High-roller event, defeating Patrik Antonius heads-up for a prize of A$2,000,000, at the time placing him second in the all-time career tournament earnings. Ivey had also placed 12th at the Aussie Millions main event for a prize of A$100,000.

On February 10, 2014, Ivey won the 2014 Aussie Millions LK Boutique $250,000 Challenge for AU$4,000,000 — the largest single cash of his career. In February 2015 he won the Aussie Millions $250,000 Challenge again, this time for AU$2,205,000, making him the only player in the history of the tournament with two consecutive championships for a total of three championships in four years.

, Ivey's total live tournament winnings exceed $26,250,000. He has also won millions playing online and in cash games. Over $6,600,000 of his total winnings have come from cashes at the WSOP. He is currently ranked 7th on the all-time money list.

Cash games
Ivey is a regular participant in the $4,000-$8,000 mixed cash game at the Bellagio in Las Vegas (often referred to as the Big Game). In February 2006, he played heads-up Limit Texas Hold'em versus Texas billionaire Andy Beal. With stakes at $25,000/$50,000 and $50,000/$100,000, Ivey won over $16,000,000 over the course of three days, during a heads up match at The Wynn Resort. Ivey was playing for "The Corporation", a group of poker professionals who pooled their money and took turns playing against Beal. Earlier in the month, Beal had beaten the Corporation out of over $13,000,000.

Online poker
Ivey was part of the original design team for Full Tilt Poker. In May 2011, Ivey filed a lawsuit in Clark County, Nevada claiming Full Tilt had breached his contract.  The suit asked for damages in excess of $150,000,000, as well as for him to be released from his contract with the company.  Ivey voluntarily withdrew the suit on June 30.

According to HighStakesDB.com, Ivey won $1.99 million on FullTilt in 2007, $7.34 million in 2008, $6.33 million in 2009, and $3 million in 2010.

Awards
All In Magazine 2005 Poker Player of the Year 

All In Magazine 2009 Poker Player of the Year

Edge-sorting litigation
Ivey has twice been successfully sued by casinos on accusations of breach of contract, both incidents being due to his manipulation of edge sorting. He lost all court challenges (initial and appeals) in both incidents, though an appeal court in the second incident arranged a mediation which led to an agreed settlement between Ivey and the casino.

In August 2012, Ivey was reported to have won £7,300,000 (US$) playing Punto Banco at Crockfords, a casino in London, but was refused payment beyond his initial £1 million stake due to his use of edge sorting. He issued a statement through his lawyers denying any misconduct: "Any allegations of wrongdoing by Crockfords are denied by me in the very strongest of terms."

In April 2014, The Borgata Casino in Atlantic City, New Jersey sued Ivey, claiming he cheated at baccarat by taking advantage of a defect in the manufacturing of the playing cards.  Both Crockfords and the Borgata used the same kind of playing cards, manufactured by Gemaco.  The Borgata is suing Gemaco as well as Ivey. The US casino sued Ivey for $15.6 million, a total which included $10 million in winnings, $5.4 million the casino’s legal team figured the casino would have beaten Ivey for if he had been playing without an improper advantage, and hundreds of thousands of dollars in comps.

On October 8, 2014, a UK court held that the techniques Ivey used at Crockford's constituted cheating and decided for the casino with costs.

In November  2015, Ivey was given permission to appeal. However, on November 3, 2016, his appeal was dismissed by the Court of Appeal, upholding the earlier decision that the technique amounted to cheating. A further appeal to the Supreme Court of the United Kingdom led to a unanimous judgement delivered on October 25, 2017, which found in favour of the casino. The court concluded that Ivey's actions constituted cheating and that, had it been necessary to make a finding on dishonesty, it would have determined that Ivey's "conduct was dishonest".

In January 2019, a federal judge allowed the Borgata to pursue Ivey's assets in Nevada to recoup more than $10 million he won at the casino using edge-sorting.

On June 27, 2019, the US Marshals Service served a writ of execution to the World Series of Poker and seized Ivey's 2019 winnings to be used towards payment to The Borgata.

After an oral argument on September 17, 2019, the United States Court of Appeals for the Third Circuit referred Ivey and the Borgata to the court’s mediation program.  On July 10, 2020, Card Player magazine reported the parties had agreed to a settlement.

Personal life
Ivey was born in Riverside, California and moved to Roselle, New Jersey, when he was three months old. He graduated from Old Bridge High School in Old Bridge Township, New Jersey.

Ivey resides in Las Vegas. In December 2009, Ivey and his then wife, Luciaetta, filed a joint petition for divorce after seven years of marriage. The divorce was granted on December 29, 2009.

Ivey is a Los Angeles Lakers, Houston Rockets, and Buffalo Bills fan and can often be seen wearing basketball jerseys.  Ivey's hobbies include video games, prop betting, and golf. He participated in the inaugural World Series of Golf, where he finished in fourth place in the final group.

Ivey has given money to a number of charitable causes.  In March 2008, he donated $50,000 to Empowered 2 Excel, a Las Vegas charity for underprivileged children, and later that week created the Budding Ivey Foundation, a non-profit organization to continue the work of his grandfather, Leonard "Bud" Simmons.  The foundation raised $260,000 (mostly for Empowered 2 Excel) at a July 3, 2008, charity poker tournament, and is also involved in children's literacy projects and programs to feed the homeless.  In 2010, he also partnered with the Make-A-Wish Foundation to bring three children to the Bellagio casino in Las Vegas. Each child was given $100 and competed in roulette, baccarat, and craps with Ivey.
Ivey has also founded two companies. Ivey Poker, established in 2012 offers a "play for free" poker App that allows users to compete against Ivey and other pros. Ivey League was a poker training site with a full roster of professional coaches launched in 2014.

References

External links

Phil Ivey MasterClass
Phil Ivey interview

1976 births
American poker players
American gamblers
Living people
Old Bridge High School alumni
People from Atlantic County, New Jersey
People from Riverside, California
People from Roselle, New Jersey
World Poker Tour winners
World Series of Poker bracelet winners
Poker After Dark tournament winners
Poker Hall of Fame inductees